Hunting Ground may refer to:
 The Hunting Ground, a 2015 documentary about sexual assault on college campuses
 Hunting Ground (comics), a 2001 Dark Horse Comics anthology
 Hunting Grounds, an Australian punk band
 "Hunting Ground", an episode of the U.S. television show CSI: Miami
 Hunting Ground, a 2009 fantasy novel by Patricia Briggs